Blå Jungfrun Östra is a lighthouse located in coastal town of Oskarshamn in Sweden, Europe.

Deactivated and moved

Lighthouse Blå Jungfrun Östra was originally located on the island and national park Blå Jungfrun in the Baltic Sea about 10 nautical miles outside Oskarshamn. After being deactivated by the Swedish maritime authorities, Sjöfartsverket, in 2002, the lighthouse was disassembled and moved into the city of Oskarshamn. It now serves as an attraction and a landmark on street Södra Långgatan in Oskarshamn.

See also

 List of lighthouses and lightvessels in Sweden

References

External links
 Sjofartsverket 
 The Swedish Lighthouse Society

Lighthouses in Sweden
Lighthouses completed in 1956
Buildings and structures in Kalmar County
Tourist attractions in Kalmar County